Shelter is a 2007 American romantic drama film produced by JD Disalvatore and directed and written by Jonah Markowitz. It stars Trevor Wright, Brad Rowe, and Tina Holmes. It was the winner of "Outstanding Film – Limited Release" at the 2009 GLAAD Media Awards, Best New Director and Favorite Narrative Feature at the Seattle Lesbian & Gay Film Festival, and the People's Choice Award for Best Feature at the Vancouver Queer Film Festival. Shelter represents the feature directorial debut of Markowitz.

Plot

Zach is an aspiring young artist living in San Pedro, California. He has put off his dreams of going to art school in order to work and help his older sister Jeanne, his disabled father, and his five-year-old nephew Cody, whom he cares for most of the time as the irresponsible Jeanne spends her time partying. Working as a short-order cook to make ends meet, Zach uses his free time to paint, surf, and hang out with his on/off girlfriend Tori and his best friend Gabe.

When Gabe's older brother Shaun comes back home from Los Angeles for a few weeks, Zach and Shaun develop a close friendship as they go surfing together. Shaun, who is a published writer, encourages Zach to take control of his life and pursue his ambition of going to CalArts. One night after drinking, Shaun kisses Zach. However, Zach is not prepared to give in to his feelings immediately and struggles with whether or not he may be gay. Soon, however, he goes to Shaun's house and the two start making out and spend the night together. Following this, Jeanne reveals her boyfriend Alan is heading to Portland for a job interview and she wants to go with him for the weekend so she needs Zach to look after Cody. Zach is reluctant, but agrees. When Shaun invites him over, he tells him to bring Cody along and the three have a great time together. Zach and Shaun's relationship begins to blossom, while at the same time Shaun builds a strong bond with Cody.

Zach feels uncomfortable when both Gabe and Jeanne learn about his relationship with Shaun. Although Gabe is supportive, Jeanne reveals her homophobic opinions and tells Zach that she does not want Cody hanging around Shaun because he is gay. She insists that since Cody's father is no longer in the picture, she needs Zach to be a positive influence and role model for Cody. At a party later that night, Zach becomes conflicted and ends things with Shaun, reasoning that he is not like him. Shaun tells him that it is obvious what he wants and calls him a coward for being too afraid to deal with it.

Shaun secretly submits Zach's art school application and Zach is eventually accepted on full scholarship. When Alan gets the job in Portland, Jeanne wants to move there with him permanently but does not want to take Cody. She wants to leave Cody with Zach for the time being. Zach is again forced to decide between putting others first and neglecting his own dreams, as he has always done. Later, he tries to tell Tori about his relationship with Shaun, only to find out she already knows and is supportive. After Zach decides to finally move forward with his art career, he goes to see Shaun and confesses that he had been accepted into the school in the past, but put it off to look after his family after his mother died. Now determined to finally go for what he wants in life, he re-affirms his love for Shaun and the two reconcile, making plans to move in together near the school.

He then goes to see Jeanne who's preparing to leave with Alan. Zach boldly walks up to her, hand in hand with Shaun, and gives Jeanne an ultimatum. If she wants to leave Cody with him then she will have to accept that Cody will be living with him and Shaun. Jeanne tries to guilt Zach, but he reminds her that she is the one who is abandoning her son, not him. He tells her that Shaun is a good guy who cares about him and Cody, and that a life with them is what is best for Cody. He tells her that he plans on finally making the life he really wants for himself. Jeanne relents, accepting what is truly best for Cody, and leaves him in the care of Zach and Shaun as she goes off to Portland with Alan. The film ends with Zach, Shaun and Cody happily playing on the beach together as a family.

Cast
 Trevor Wright as Zach
 Brad Rowe as Shaun
 Tina Holmes as Jeanne
 Jackson Wurth as Cody
 Ross Thomas as Gabe
 Katie Walder as Tori
 Albert Reed as Billy
 Joy Gohring as Ellen
 Matt Bushell as Alan
 Caitlin Crosby as Shari
Raquel Justin as blue

Production
Shelter was filmed in 21 days, primarily in San Pedro and Laguna Beach, California, with additional shooting in Bel Air and Malibu, California. A visual focal point throughout the film is the Vincent Thomas Bridge in Los Angeles Harbor.

The artwork depicted in the film was the work of L.A. artist Ryan Graeff, whose street art appears across the region and is profiled on his blog Restitution Press.

The motion picture soundtrack features original music by Grammy Award Winning singer/songwriter Shane McAnally (credited to Shane Mack).

Release
Shelter debuted at the 31st Frameline Film Festival in San Francisco on June 16, 2007 and ran in theaters through July 24, 2008. It played at over 100 film festivals worldwide and won 27 "Best Of" awards.  The film was released on DVD on May 27, 2008 in the United States. The DVD includes production commentary by writer/director Jonah Markowitz and actors Trevor Wright and Brad Rowe.

The film was released on DVD in the UK on August 11, 2008, though the UK release does not include the commentary track. The film was released on Blu-ray in the UK in October 2011.

Soundtrack
The soundtrack album, Shelter: Music from the Motion Picture, was released in 2008.

"Goin' Home" (written and performed by Bill Ferguson)
"I Like That" (written and performed by Shane Mack)
"No Way Home" (written and performed by Matt Pavolaitis and Brett Cookingham)
"Pirate Sounds" (written by Ariel Rechtshald, Josh Kessler, Marc Ferrari, and Lewis Pesacov, performed by Matthew Popieluch)
"Teenage Romanticide" (written by Jen Mitz, Nina Martinez, and Susan Gale, performed by Dance Yourself to Death)
"Look for Love" (written and performed by Tony Valenzuela)
"Darkness Descends" (written by Ariel Rechtshald, Josh Kessler, Marc Ferrari, and Lewis Pesacov, performed by Matthew Popieluch)
"Vaporizer" (written and performed by Nicholas Viterelli)
"What Do You Believe In" (written by Jeffrey S. Haycock; arranged by Christopher J Welsh & Scott "SkooB" Wilson; performed by The Vengers)
"Trying" (written by Ariel Rechtshald, Josh Kessler, and Matthew Popieluch, performed by Matthew Popieluch)
"Gimmie Clam" (written and performed by Nicholas Viterelli)
"Break" (written and performed by Shane Mack)
"Reflection" (written and performed by Todd Hannigan)
"Lie to Me" (written and performed by Shane Mack)
"Time to Time" (written by Stewart Lewis and Reed Foehl, performed by Stewart Lewis)
"More Than This" (written and performed by Shane Mack)
"Long Way Home" (written and performed by Shane Mack)
"Remember to Forget" (written and performed by Shane Mack)
"Cool of Morning" (written and performed by Matt Pavolaitis and Brett Cookingham)

Critical reception
On Metacritic, the film holds a score of 66 based on 11 reviews, indicating "generally favorable reviews".

As of 2015, Shelter has been in the top three on Logo's NewNowNext's yearly reader poll "The Top 100 Greatest Gay Movies" for seven straight years and has been #1 twice. Sid Smith from the Chicago Tribune said that Shelter '"captures the beauty, thrill and ache of young love and extracts a casual joy out of the process." Entertainment Weekly gave the film a B+ rating, and Out Magazine called it "an instant classic".  The Seattle Times writes, "What could have been a standard-issue coming-out, coming-of-age movie develops a remarkable intimacy. It’s a star-making, multilayered role, and Wright makes it his own. He connects with the character’s passion and mischief, as well as his secretive and sometimes cowardly side."

Albert Williams from the Chicago Reader wrote “What might have been a routine coming-out story is enriched by Trevor Wright‘s accomplished and honest performance, Jonah Markowitz’s straightforward dialogue, and Joseph White’s cinematography of the majestic surf and melancholy sunsets off Malibu.” Elizabeth Weitzman from the New York Daily News wrote “Actors Trevor Wright and Brad Rowe are good enough to turn a formulaic coming-out tale into a sweet romance.”

In praise of the film, David Weigand from the San Francisco Chronicle singled out "a superb performance by Trevor Wright in the lead role, a strong supporting cast, very good cinematography and, most of all, emotional authenticity", noting in particular Trevor Wright's "restrained and delicately balanced performance" as "the beating heart of the film from the start".

Awards
 GLAAD Media Awards – Won, Outstanding Film – Limited Release, 2009.
 Seattle Lesbian & Gay Film Festival – Won, Best New Director (Jonah Markowitz), 2007.
 Seattle Lesbian & Gay Film Festival – Won, Favorite Narrative Feature, 2007.
 Vancouver Queer Film Festival – Won, People's Choice Award for Best Feature, 2007.
 Tampa Gay & Lesbian Film Festival – Won, Best Actor (Trevor Wright), 2007.
 Tampa Gay & Lesbian Film Festival – Won, Audience Award for Best Cinematography (Joseph White), 2007.
 Philadelphia International Gay & Lesbian Film Festival – Won, Special Award for first-time director (Jonah Markowitz), 2007.
 Dallas OUT TAKES – Won, Best Film, 2007.
 Outfest – Won, HBO Outstanding First Dramatic Feature (Jonah Markowitz), 2007.
 Melbourne Queer Film Festival – Won, Audience Choice Award for Best Feature, 2007.

See also
List of lesbian, gay, bisexual, or transgender-related films by storyline

References

External links
 
 
 
 
 "Surfing pals find much more than good waves in Shelter" – Review by Delfin Vigil of the San Francisco Chronicle, June 10, 2007, leading up to the film's debut at Frameline31, San Francisco.
 "Gimme Shelter" – Article and review by Dennis Hensley of The Advocate, February 22, 2008.
 "Out on the Waves: Shelter (2007)" – New York Times review of Shelter, March 28, 2008.
 Blog by JD – Interview with producer JD Disalvatore.
 The Restitution Press – Artist Ryan Graeff website
 MIPtalk.com & Screen Actors Guild present Shelter Reunion + Q&A

2007 films
2007 directorial debut films
2007 LGBT-related films
2007 romantic drama films
2000s coming-of-age drama films
2000s sports drama films
American LGBT-related films
American romantic drama films
American sports drama films
Coming-of-age romance films
2000s English-language films
Films scored by J. Peter Robinson
Films set in Los Angeles
Films shot in Los Angeles
Gay-related films
Here TV original programming
LGBT-related coming-of-age films
LGBT-related romantic drama films
LGBT-related sports drama films
American surfing films
2000s American films